NGC 217 is a spiral or lenticular galaxy located approximately 178 light-years from the Solar System in the constellation Cetus. It was discovered on November 28, 1785 by William Herschel.

See also 
 List of NGC objects (1–1000)

References

External links 
 
 
 SEDS

0217
Cetus (constellation)
2482
Astronomical objects discovered in 1785
Discoveries by William Herschel
Spiral galaxies